Jonelle Matthews was a 12-year-old American girl who disappeared near Greeley, Colorado, on December 20, 1984. Her remains were discovered on July 24, 2019, by construction workers putting in a new pipeline  from her home. Steven Pankey was sentenced to life imprisonment on October 31, 2022, after his arrest in 2020.

Family
Jonelle Matthews was born at Cottage Hospital in Santa Barbara, California, on February 9, 1972, to 13-year-old Terri Vierra. Jonelle was adopted in March 1972 by James "Jim" and Gloria Matthews, a married couple with a daughter, living in Greeley, Colorado.  At the time of her disappearance, Jonelle's father was the principal of Platte Valley Elementary School in Kersey, Colorado.

Disappearance
On the evening of December 20, 1984, Jonelle was performing in a Christmas concert at IntraWest Bank of Denver as a member of Greeley's Franklin Middle School Choir. Her father was at his other daughter's basketball game and her mother had traveled out of state to be with Jonelle's ill grandfather. At 8:15 PM, Jonelle arrived home in Greeley, Colorado, after getting a ride from her friend, DeeAnna Ross, and DeeAnna's father. Shortly after 8:30 PM, Jonelle answered a phone call and took a message for her father. The phone call was the last time anyone was known to have spoken with Jonelle.

Her father arrived home at 9:30 PM and found the garage door open, but no one was in the house. Jonelle's shoes and shawl were near a heater in the family room, a place she often sat. Jonelle's older sister, Jennifer, got home at 10:00 PM, but had not seen her. Their father began to worry and called police. The police arrived at 10:15 PM and found footprints in the snow, indicating that someone had been looking in the windows. There were no signs of a struggle or of forced entry. With snow on the ground, Jonelle's father thought it unlikely that she would go far without shoes.

For several weeks after the disappearance, law enforcement placed Jonelle's birth mother, Terri Vierra-Martinez, under surveillance without telling her that Jonelle was missing. In 1994, Jonelle was declared legally dead. In 1997, Gloria Matthews received a letter from Vierra requesting permission to visit Jonelle. Vierra had used a search consultant to help locate Jonelle. The Matthews notified Vierra about what happened and the families became friends.

Years after Jonelle's disappearance, her parents moved to the Philippines. They are currently retired and living in Costa Rica. Jonelle's sister married and moved out of Colorado.

Public interest 
The disappearance attracted interest from the public, including the president of the United States and members of Congress. President Ronald Reagan mentioned Jonelle Matthews in a speech on March 7, 1985, from Room 450 of the Old Executive Office Building. She was mentioned in the Congressional Record for the United States House of Representatives on April 2, 1985, page 7224. In 2010, the Greeley Tribune published another summary of the case. As recently as 2018, Greeley Police had been re-contacting witnesses and applying the latest forensic advances in their investigation. She appears in the International Center for Unidentified and Missing Persons' database.

A chokecherry tree was planted in front of Franklin Middle School in memory of Jonelle. The tree died after a few years and a plaque inscribed with Jonelle's name disappeared.

Discovery of remains
Based on DNA evidence, the Weld County Coroner's Office positively identified the remains as being those of Jonelle Matthews. The forensic report listed Jonelle's cause of death as "a gunshot wound to the head".

Investigation
On September 13, 2019, the Greeley Police Department announced that Steven Dana Pankey, a former Greeley resident who ran for governor in Idaho in 2014 and 2018 and for lieutenant governor in 2010, was a person of interest in Jonelle Matthews' abduction and death.

On Wednesday, September 4, 2019, police in Twin Falls, Idaho, searched Pankey's condo under a warrant that stated investigators had probable cause to believe that Pankey abducted and murdered Jonelle. Pankey and his former wife lived about three miles from the Matthews home and he had been a youth pastor at the church the Matthews family attended. Greeley Police Commander Roy Smith stated that Pankey "had made repeated efforts to speak with detectives" about the Matthews case, but refused to answer questions when detectives traveled to Twin Falls on August 15, 2019.

On October 13, 2020, Pankey was indicted on charges of first-degree murder and kidnapping in Jonelle's death. He was held without bail at the Ada County Jail in Boise until he was extradited to Colorado. Steven Pankey was 69 years old at the time of his indictment.

Pankey knew he was a person of interest in September 2019 when he was interviewed by the Idaho Statesman. Pankey told the newspaper that he did not know Jonelle or the Matthews family and had only heard about them following the disappearance. He said he and his wife were home on the night of Jonelle's disappearance. He said they were planning to leave town the next day for a Christmas visit with family members in Big Bear Lake, California, and had already loaded their car. Decades later, Pankey provided investigators with documents concerning this trip, which police said contained "false statements and superfluous details".

Pankey's ex-wife, Angela Hicks, said they started their trip on December 22, two days after Jonelle's disappearance. She also said this trip was unexpected. Hicks said they returned to Greeley on December 26 and that Pankey took an unusual interest in the disappearance. She said that on their return trip, Pankey "uncharacteristically listened to the radio, searching for news of the girl's disappearance". She also said that after their return, Pankey forced her to read to him newspaper articles concerning the case. According to the 2020 indictment statement, shortly following their return to Greeley, Pankey started digging in their yard. At about that time, a car stored on their property caught fire and the burned car "was disposed of at a salvage yard".

A few months following Jonelle's disappearance, Pankey attended a church service where a minister claimed that Jonelle would be found safe. Hicks claimed to have heard Pankey muttering in response, accusing the minister of being a false prophet. In 2008, Pankey's son was murdered. At his son's funeral, Hicks reportedly heard Pankey say, "I hope God didn't allow this to happen because of Jonelle Matthews."

Jennifer Mogensen, Jonelle's older sister, said her family experienced "some closure" when they learned that Jonelle was murdered and she considers Pankey's arrest "another gift to our family". Mogensen's father was reportedly "especially excited to see justice". Mogensen said that while there had been sibling rivalry between her and Jonelle in 1984, Jonelle's killing eliminated the possibility for the two siblings to grow closer.

The police announced that Pankey had long been a person of interest in the case. Pankey repeatedly claimed to have knowledge of the crime and had asked "for immunity in exchange for information". The criminal indictment said that he "intentionally inserted himself in the investigation many times over the years claiming to have knowledge of the crime which grew inconsistent and incriminating over time". Pankey had claimed that on the evening of Jonelle's abduction, a rake was used to cover up tracks left in the snow. He also claimed to have watched students walking home from the middle school which Jonelle attended.

Pankey gave an interview to the Times-News and said he was being framed by the police because of his sexuality, identifying himself as a "celibate homosexual". In 2018, Pankey had campaigned for the Idaho Republican Party's nomination for the position of governor of Idaho. His campaign website said that Pankey has studied criminal justice.

Trial
On October 13, 2020, Steven Pankey was indicted on charges of murdering and kidnapping Matthews.  Following extradition from Idaho, Pankey made his first appearance in a Colorado courtroom in Greeley on October 30, 2020.

Pankey's trial began on Thursday, October 14, 2021, ultimately ending in a mistrial on November 4, 2021, due to a hung jury. The jury voted to convict Pankey on a single misdemeanor count of making false statements to police, but was unable to come to a unanimous verdict on the kidnapping and murder charges. The prosecution argued that Pankey's behavior and statements incriminated him in the murder, but Pankey's defense attorney argued that his "obsessive interest" in the case could be attributed to Asperger syndrome.
Upon retrial, Pankey was found guilty of the kidnapping and murder of Jonelle by a Weld County jury on October 31, 2022. He received a sentence of 20 years to life in prison. His earliest possible release date is in 2042, at which point he will be 91 years old.

See also
List of kidnappings
List of solved missing person cases
List of unsolved murders

References

1984 murders in the United States
1980s missing person cases
1984 in Colorado
Deaths by firearm in Colorado
Deaths by person in Colorado
December 1984 events in the United States
December 1984 crimes
Formerly missing people
Greeley, Colorado
Kidnapped American children
Missing person cases in Colorado
Murdered American children
Unsolved murders in the United States
Female murder victims
Incidents of violence against girls
People murdered in Colorado